This is a List of naval flags of the Russian Federation, from independence from the Soviet Union in 1991 onward, for Soviet naval flags see List of USSR navy flags.

Jack

Naval Ensign (National naval flag)

Navy flag

Ensigns of auxiliary vessels of the Navy

Naval flag of the National Guard Forces Command

Flags of ships of Border Guard Force

Flags of officials

Flags of commanders-in-chief of the Armed Forces

Flags of officials of the Navy

Flags of officials of the Border Guard Force

Flags of officials of FSB

Flags of officials of the National Guard

References 
Tokar L. N., Razygraev M. V., Ship flags, pendants and badges. 1700—2006. Moscow, Russian Knights Foundation, 2007. 580 pages. 
Военно-морские флаги и вымпелы Российской Федерации (Naval flags and pennants Russia)
ШТАНДАРТЫ, ФЛАГИ И ВЫМПЕЛЫ (Departmental flags and pennants Russia)

See also 
 List of Russian flags
 List of Soviet navy flags

Lists of flags of Russia
Russian Navy
Russia
Fla